Gábor Riz (born March 5, 1956) is a Hungarian educator and politician, member of the National Assembly (MP) for Ózd (Borsod-Abaúj-Zemplén County Constituency V then III) since 2010.

Riz is a member of the Economic and Information Technology Committee since May 14, 2010 and Committee on Education, Science and Research from September 30, 2013 to May 5, 2014. He was appointed a member of the Committee on European Affairs in October 2018.

References

1956 births
Living people
Hungarian educators
Fidesz politicians
Members of the National Assembly of Hungary (2010–2014)
Members of the National Assembly of Hungary (2014–2018)
Members of the National Assembly of Hungary (2018–2022)
Members of the National Assembly of Hungary (2022–2026)
People from Ózd
University of Debrecen alumni